St Peter's College was established by Benedictine monks of St. Peter's Abbey in 1921. St. Peter's Abbey was founded in 1903 on the same site as the college. From 1921 until 1972 the College also offered a boys high school program. Today the college offers the first two years of the University of Saskatchewan Arts and Science program. The College is located in a rural setting, approximately a one-hour drive from the University of Saskatchewan campus.

The college became affiliated with the University of Saskatchewan in 1926.

Past Principals/Presidents 
1924-1931 - Wilfred Hergott, OSB
1931-1935 - Matthew Michel, OSB
1935-1960 - Xavier Benning, OSB
1960-1966 - Albert Ruetz, OSB
1966-1972 - Vincent Morrison, OSB
1972, 1976-1983 - Andrew Britz, OSB
1972-1976, 1983-1989 - Maurice Weber, OSB
1989-1993 - Tony Saretsky, B.Ed., B.A.
1993-1998 - Wendy Schissel, Ph.D
1993-1998 - Barry Popowich, Ph.D
1998-2005 - Colleen Fitzgerald, Ph.D
2005-2009 - Rob Harasymchuk
2010 - 2011 - Glen Kobussen
2011 - Present - Rob Harasymchuk

References

External links

 

Educational institutions established in 1921
University of Saskatchewan
1921 establishments in Saskatchewan